Fathima Reddy (born 31 August 1979) is an Indian former cricketer. He played one List A match for Hyderabad in 1999/00.

See also
 List of Hyderabad cricketers

References

External links
 

1979 births
Living people
Indian cricketers
Hyderabad cricketers
Cricketers from Hyderabad, India